Carson Park is a baseball stadium located in Carson Park, a park in Eau Claire, Wisconsin.  It was built as a Works Progress Administration project in 1936, and it is listed on the National Register of Historic Places.

The stadium is home to the Eau Claire Express of the Northwoods League, the Eau Claire Cavaliers amateur team, the Eau Claire Bears amateur team, the Eau Claire Pizza Hut American Legion team, the Eau Claire Memorial, North, Regis and Immanuel Lutheran high school baseball teams, and the UW-Eau Claire club baseball team.

The left field wall is adjacent to the sideline of the Carson Park football stadium field.  During the football season, temporary bleachers from the baseball stadium are positioned on left field with the front of the bleachers placed along the left field wall facing the football field.

History

The land that became home to Carson Park, located on a peninsula surrounded by Half Moon Lake in Eau Claire, was donated in 1914 to the city of Eau Claire by an heir to William Carson.  The following year, the park was opened.  Construction of a sports complex, including a baseball stadium, football stadium and tennis courts, began in 1935 as a Works Progress Administration project.  The first game was played in the stadium on May 4, 1937, in a Northern League game between the Eau Claire Bears and Superior Blues.

The stadium later was home to the Eau Claire Braves minor league baseball team.  Among those who played for the Braves were Henry Aaron, Joe Torre, Bob Uecker, Andy Pafko and others who later played in Major League Baseball.  Following the departure of the Braves in the 1960s, the Eau Claire Cavaliers amateur team began play in 1971.  Under manager Harv Tomter, the team won 5 amateur baseball national championships.

A statue honoring Henry Aaron was erected in front of the stadium in 1994.  A renovation project around 1997/98 added permanent seats behind home play, benches in the lower areas of the grandstand, and a remodeled concourse and exterior.

Upon the arrival of the Eau Claire Express Northwoods League franchise in 2005, the stadium underwent renovations for that season.  A fan deck was added in the right field corner, a children's area was added along the 3rd-base foul line near the left field corner, and an electronic message board was added to the scoreboard.  The field was re-leveled and re-sodded prior to the 2007 season.  The press box was expanded with new sections along the first- and third-base sides for the 2009 season.

References

External links
 Ballpark Digest's Carson Park page
 Eau Claire Cavaliers website
 Eau Claire Express website
 Wisconsin National Register of Historic Places' Carson Park page

Sports venues on the National Register of Historic Places in Wisconsin
Sports in Eau Claire, Wisconsin
Parks in Wisconsin
Minor league baseball venues
Baseball venues in Wisconsin
National Register of Historic Places in Eau Claire County, Wisconsin
1937 establishments in Wisconsin
Sports venues completed in 1937
College baseball venues in the United States
High school baseball venues in the United States